Cambridge-South Dorchester High School is located in Cambridge, Maryland, United States, is part of the Dorchester County Public Schools system, and serves students in grades 9 to 12.  The school opened in 1976 and cost $9 million to build and equip. Designed by architects Johannes and Murray of Silver Spring, the school's most prominent feature is its circular design.

Sports teams 
Students at C-SDHS can participate in the following sports:

Boys' Soccer 
Girls' Soccer 
Track 
Cross Country (State Champions - (women's) 2014) 
Cheerleading 
Football (State Champions - 1979, 1995, 1996) 
Boys' Basketball (State Champions - 1955, 1980, 1989, 1996)  
Girls' Basketball
Swimming (2013 State Champion Swimming)
Wrestling (2013 State Champion Wrestler)
Tennis 
Softball
Baseball (State Champions - 1977, 2004, 2013)
Boys' Lacrosse
Girls' Lacrosse

References

External links 
Official C-SDHS Website
Dorchester County Public Schools

Cambridge, Maryland
Public high schools in Maryland
Educational institutions established in 1976
Schools in Dorchester County, Maryland
1976 establishments in Maryland